Cooper v Wakley  (1828) 172 ER 507 is an English tort law case, concerning the libel by the editor of The Lancet.

Facts
Dr.Thomas Wakley alleged in The Lancet that Dr. Bransby Cooper had negligently performed an operation on a patient. He alleged Dr. Cooper caused a patient incredible suffering as he attempted to extract a bladder stone through a cut beneath the scrotum. The patient subsequently died. Dr. Cooper sued Dr. Wakley for defaming him and asked for 2000 pounds to be paid in damages. The Court ruled in favor of Dr Cooper and awarded him 100 pounds as damages.

Judgment

See also
English tort law

Notes

References

English defamation case law
English tort case law
1828 in British law
1828 in case law